The 2015 Western Canada Cup was the Western Canadian Junior A ice hockey championship played at the Casman Centre in Fort McMurray, Alberta from April 25 to May 3, 2015.  It determined the two Western seeds for the 2015 Royal Bank Cup, the Canadian Junior A National Championship.  The Penticton Vees and Portage Terriers finished first and second, respectively.  As the Terriers already secured a berth in the Royal Bank Cup as the host team, the second runner-up Melfort Mustangs were awarded the second Western seed.

Round robin

x = Clinched championship round berth

Tie Breaker: Head-to-Head, then 3-way +/-.

Results 

Schedule and results can be found on the official website.

Semi and Finals

References

See also
2015 Royal Bank Cup
Western Canada Cup

Western Canada Cup
2014–15 in Canadian ice hockey
Fort McMurray
Ice hockey in Alberta
April 2015 sports events in Canada
May 2015 sports events in Canada